Michael Schimmer (born 10 January 1967) is a German sprinter. He competed in the men's 4 × 400 metres relay at the 1988 Summer Olympics, representing East Germany.

References

External links
 

1967 births
Living people
Athletes (track and field) at the 1988 Summer Olympics
German male sprinters
Olympic athletes of East Germany
Place of birth missing (living people)